The Heckscher Foundation for Children is a New York City-focused private foundation that provides grants to underserved New York City youth. Often, the foundation's grant-giving takes the form of program support, capacity-building, capital projects and general operating support.

Mission 
The Heckscher Foundation directs its resources to "level the playing field" for needy youth by providing access to education, job training, social services and experiences that make for a richer, more forward-reaching life.

History 
The Heckscher Foundation for Children was founded in 1921 by German-born industrialist, financier and philanthropist  August Heckscher. Responding to a request for a donation for the purchase of a bus by the Society for the Prevention of Cruelty to Children, August Heckscher donated a Manhattan property on Fifth Avenue from 104th to 105th Street that opened as The Heckscher Foundation for Children 
in 1922 and provided housing for children and community activities.

However, the Great Depression of the 1930s resulted in the deterioration of the foundation's assets to the point of near collapse. August Heckscher recruited Arthur Smadbeck and Ruth Smadbeck, friends and financial equals  who shared his dedication to public service to help rebuild the foundation.

Ruth Smadbeck began as a volunteer in the 1930s and ran the foundation for over 50 years, including its programs of dance, orchestra, exercise, swimming, the purchase and distribution of necessities for indigent children, a kindergarten, a theater, a craft room, a senior lounge, a photography group, a library, and a thrift shop. The Communications and Learning Center at Marymount Manhattan College is named for Ruth Smadbeck.

By the time of August Heckscher's death in 1941, foundation income was such that no distributions to charity were possible. From 1941 until his death in 1977, Arthur Smadbeck donated his time and efforts to disposing of losing foundation assets, consolidating others and creating a profitable platform on which he positioned the foundation to support major outside charitable efforts.
At Ruth Smadbeck's death in 1986, distributions to charity had grown to $1,169,219 and assets had grown to $22,072,773.  Renowned real estate entrepreneur and civic leader Louis Smadbeck became chairman of the foundation in 1986, and continued in this capacity until his death in 1992.  Virginia Sloane was elected president in 1986, and presided over the foundation's philanthropic projects for some 25 years. In 2012, she became president emeritus. She died at the age of 91 on August 24, 2014.

In 1997, a new generation assumed leadership roles. Howard Sloane became chairman and CEO and continues to preside over the foundation's projects and programming. Today, the foundation's assets have grown to well over $300 million, and distributions to charity have dramatically increased.

Funding approaches 

The modern-day foundation practices catalytic giving, identifying and supporting projects with potential for wide-ranging applications, and helps to leverage such programs to scale. The foundation also unites not for profits with for profits and the public sector to support common goals in strategic projects, and continues to provide grants for projects that seek to solve specific problems, such as helping New York City's middle school students make informed choices about which high schools to attend. The Heckscher Foundation also operates programs of its own and is a well-known backer of public and New York City Parks Department recreational facilities in New York.

Signature Initiatives 
The foundation concentrates on funding projects in education/academia, arts, health and recreation, social services, workforce development and capacity-building and training for the benefit of children and young people.

Social services 

  To combat the growing obesity of children and youth, the Heckscher Foundation gave initial funding support for "KickinNutrition.TV," digital and interactive educational television programming that promotes healthy eating and behaviors to New York middle school children, and measures changes in nutrition behaviors of the youth its serves using field-vetted assessment tools developed for a similar USDA-funded pilot conducted in Cambridge, Massachusetts. The foundation provided funding that tested the curriculum's effectiveness in New York City public schools in the 2014-2015 program year, and provided funding to distribute KNTV for New York City Title 1 schools during 2015-2016.
  In 2015, the Heckscher Foundation, The Westchester Community Foundation and D.C.-based  advocacy organization Young Invincibles collaborated to underwrite and develop HealthYI, an app for millennials that is designed to help them understand and navigate their healthcare options under the Patient Protection and Affordable Care Act.
  In 2014, the Heckscher Foundation contributed $1 million to a $10 million project initiated by Bloomberg Philanthropies that is designed to assist top-performing students from low- and middle-income families enroll in and graduate from the nation's top colleges and universities.
  The foundation provides funding to Girls Educational and Mentoring Services (GEMS), which in turn provides support to young women and girls who are the victims of commercial human trafficking and exploitation.
 In 2006, Heckscher Foundation developed and funded the Summer Meals Outreach project, and through it expanded The New York City Department of Education's Summer Meals Program that provides free breakfast and lunch to as many New York City public school students in the summer months as it does during the school year. In 2012, The DOE introduced mobile refrigerated trucks that provided meals to children at Orchard Beach in the Bronx and at Flushing Meadows Park.
  Responding to the economic crises, the Heckscher Foundation gives grant funding to New York Common Pantry, Manhattan's largest community-based food pantry for its family pantry program, which serves local families in areas with the highest incidence of obesity and diabetes with nutritiously balanced food. Earlier, New York Common Pantry and Heckscher developed the Nutrition Initiative for Children and Families (now known as Live Healthy!) which distributes 2.4 million nutritious meals a year.
 In response to the aging out foster care crisis in New York and in collaboration with New York City's Administration for Children's Services, foster care agencies, and two youth service providers, Heckscher Foundation developed and funded the Academy Foster Care Project designed to help older foster care teens reach their educational goals, prepare for work and achieve personal growth and development. Since 2009, The Academy has been operated by F.E.G.S Health and Human Services System in cooperation with the New York City Administration for Children's Services (ACS) and multiple foster care agencies across the city. The Academy project continues to be funded by The Heckscher Foundation.
 To raise awareness about the challenges facing New York's military communities and their families,  the foundation organized a roundtable discussion with representatives from other local non profits, and subsequently published a report of the findings entitled, Serving those who Serve: Military Families and Children.
 Responding to the "drop out crisis" among low-income, minority children attending large, public schools, in 2010 the foundation introduced Student Sponsored Partnership that gives tuition assistance and tutoring to a group of high school students in the class of 2015.

Community-focused projects in New York City 

 The foundation gave a grant to the Citizens Committee for New York City, a nonprofit that provides micro-grant funding and supports volunteer-led neighborhood groups carrying out community improvement projects in neighborhoods and schools across all five boroughs.
 As a lead supporter of New York Needs You (NYNU), Heckscher Foundation provided funding for the NYNU Fellows Program, in which Mentor Coaches and other instructors coach first-generation college students to develop and realize life and career plans.
 The foundation gave a grant to Citizens Committee for New York City, which in turn provides micro-grant funding and supports volunteer-led neighborhood groups carrying out community improvement projects in neighborhoods and schools across all five boroughs.
 Heckscher launched a Library project that is operated by New Visions for Public Schools and builds "campus" libraries in public school buildings. A state-of-the-art library at the Prospect Heights campus in Brooklyn was completed in 2009.
  Following Hurricane Sandy, the foundation extended to its grantees an Emergency Assistance Request for applications, and provided emergency relief funding to seven non profits serving children and their families in New York City for temporary housing, counseling, transportation, food and household supplies.
  In 2014, the foundation provided funding to an Instrument Drive organized by classical music radio station WQXR-FM that collected and repaired unwanted musical instruments of New York City area donors. After being repaired, the instruments were redistributed to New York area schools with underserved music programs.
  In partnership with the Institute for Innovation in Public School Choice in 2014, the foundation funded the design and development of a web platform and mobile application software pilot program aimed at enabling underserved NYC middle school students to make informed choices among the nearly 700 programs available at more than 400 city public high schools.
  In 2013, to improve the welfare of underserved youth and their families, the foundation supported a new collaboration one-year pilot program with Seedco to provide recruiting, training, placement and support of some 40 youth. For two years beyond the initial support, the program provides follow-up services provided in partnership with three employers in truck driving and restaurant/food services jobs.
 The foundation gave a grant to the Gracie Mansion Conservancy for the development of Gracie Mansion: A Student Guide to the People's House, an award-winning student tour guide that explains the history of Gracie Mansion.
  The Heckscher Foundation has been a long-time supporter of Harlem RBI a year-round youth development program based in East Harlem, New York serving youth ages 5–21.

Education and academic support 

 In 2012, the foundation supported Leadership Enterprise for a Diverse America (LEDA) for its annual Scholars Program to develop and support high-achieving and economically disadvantaged high students for placement in the nation's top colleges and universities.
 The foundation supports Brooklyn-based Opportunities for a Better Tomorrow's "Out of School Youth" program that provides 17- to 21-year-old students with full academic training and GED prep in two 20-week annual cycles. The foundation's grant funded expansion of the program to Jamaica, Queens through a partnership with the Jamaica YMCA.
  The foundation is a funder of The Education Innovation Laboratory at Harvard University (EdLabs), which employs a research and design model designed to identify root causes of performance gaps, vet options for reform, and identify and replicate "solutions" that will improve public schools in the U.S.
  The foundation developed The New York City High School Application Guide, a free mobile app and website that helps eighth grade students identify best-fit public high schools. The Guide uses information about students' interests, current middle school, and willingness to commute to provide a customized list of high school recommendations with an emphasis on higher-performing schools that have a strong track record of graduating students in four years.
 The foundation is a long-time supporter  of the small schools initiative of the Urban Assembly schools, which contracts with New York City to operate 22 schools in the city's most underserved communities.
 In 2012, the foundation granted seed funding to Los Angeles-based QuestBridge  to launch the Quest for Excellence Award for the first time in New York City, which provided hundreds of low-income New York City high school juniors with access to top colleges.
 In collaboration with Children for Children, the foundation developed the Teacher's Aid Program, which awards grants to teachers for out-of-pocket expenses such as books and school supplies.
 The foundation provides funding to Teach for America, a not-for-profit that recruits outstanding recent college graduates from all backgrounds and career interests to commit to teach for two years in urban and rural public schools. In 2014, the foundation partnered with Charles Hayden Foundation to fund the Veteran's Initiative, designed to recruit veterans to become teachers for Teach for America.
 The foundation developed the Single Stop USA project which helps low-income, high needs students attain college degrees by connecting them to the government funds and benefits to which they are eligible for such as food stamps, health care, child care and tax credits. The program was started at Kingsborough Community College and has since expanded to CUNY campuses. On the basis of the foundation's initial grant, Single Stop has been building system-wide collaborations for expansion, including partnerships with the Association of Community College Trustees, the City College of San Francisco, and Miami Dade College.
 Heckscher's Summer Internship program was introduced in 2006 to high school students from Urban Assembly schools in New York, combining service to not-for-profit agencies, individual tutoring and college guidance.
 The foundation gave a grant to CA-based CollegeSpring to replicate its college access model to students in New York City.
 The Heckscher Scholars program offers individual tutoring and college guidance to juniors and seniors from Urban Assembly schools in New York.

Workforce development and job training

 A pilot class of new mechanics graduated from Bicycle Mechanic Skills Academy in 2014 following completion of a first-of-its-kind 10-week program run by Henry Street Settlement and funded by the Heckscher Foundation and the Consortium for Worker Education. The program trained 27 lower east side residents through classroom and apprenticeships in local bike shops throughout Manhattan.
  In collaboration with CVS Pharmacy, Lehman College, the New York Alliance for Careers in Healthcare and independent community-based nonprofit Comprehensive Development, the foundation gave funding for a pilot program to rigorously train and place disadvantaged 18- to 24-year-old New York students or recent graduates into Certified Pharmacy Technician jobs.
  The foundation gave a pilot grant to Paraprofessional Healthcare Institute to expand its established workforce development job training and placement services for women home health aides in the direct-care workforce supporting elderly and disabled individuals.
  The foundation provided a grant to support Seedco's Youth Advancing in the Workplace job pilot program that provides job placement and related support to low-income "out of school, out of work" youth in New York City.
  In 2013-14, Heckscher Foundation gave a grant to San Francisco-based Juma Ventures to pilot the YouthMade program in New York, a workforce training and part-time placement program modeled on the SFMade program in San Francisco that is providing 40 college-bound students with skills training before, during and after college graduation, including placement in sustainable long-term manufacturing employment in New York.
  In collaboration with The Training Resource Center, the foundation funded a 2013 pilot program for unemployed youth who were not in school and did not possess a GED to embark on a viable career pathway as substance abuse counselors.
  Responding to the need for socioeconomic diversity in the legal profession, the foundation provided initial funding for TRIALS, a collaborative 5-week long intensive summer study program for the LSAT operated in conjunction with the Advantage Testing Foundation, Harvard Law and NYU Law School.
 The foundation gave a grant to Minority Worker Training Program for their job training program, which is focused on generating career opportunities in construction, green sector, and environmental remediation.
 The foundation provides grants to Reading Partners  to support their programming to help children become lifelong readers and funded the program's expansion to thirteen schools in New York.
 Heckscher Foundation funded a green jobs training program at St. Nicks Alliance  that provided Environmental Remediation Technician (ERT) training to a cohort of young adults.
  Heckscher Foundation provides funding to Getting Out and Staying Out (GOSO), a program that provides inmates with life-skill coaching, educational support and guidance and workforce readiness.

Capacity-building 

 Following initial 2015 funding that helped launch Cause Strategy Partners (CSP), the foundation provided a second round of funding in 2016 to build on CSP's success at placing younger, next-generation members on the boards of New York City nonprofits, including Heckscher grantees.
 The foundation funded Taproot Foundation's "Service Grant" pilot program, which is focused on helping other nonprofits measure and track key performance indicators associated with their programming. In 2014, the foundation funded Taproot's "Next Gen" program to place leaders on boards and, in turn, train them to drive pro bono resources into their nonprofit.
 The Heckscher Foundation has worked on several projects with SeaChange Partners, a nonprofit investment bank that provides leveraged funding opportunities to donors. The foundation funded development by SeaChange of analysis, modeling and planning tools for CARE USA, invested in The New York Merger, Acquisition and Collaboration Fund,  a SeaChange fund that unites like-minded youth-serving organizations for potential mergers and joint ventures, and provided funding in 2012 for a capacity-building project in which SeaChange worked with College Possible, to prepare the college access non profit to replicate its successful program to New York and other states. In 2014, the foundation was one of the five backers of the New York Pooled PRI Fund established by SeaChange to make flexible, high-impact capital available to nonprofits that work with and on behalf of low-income New Yorkers.
The foundation has supported The Future Project, a leadership and college access program.

Parks and recreation

The Heckscher Foundation has a long history of funding development and reconstruction of New York's public parks and gardens, especially those serving youth.

 The Heckscher Playground in Central Park opened in 1926 and is the park's largest and oldest playground.
 In 2014, the foundation funded the reconstruction of the Ruth and Arthur Smadbeck Heckscher East Playground, located at the east side of 79th Street.
 The foundation underwrote the development of Central Park's Asser Levy Playground and funded the $600,000 reconstruction of the West 110th Street playground in 2007.
 In 2010, Heckscher sponsored The Central Park Conservancy's five-year Woodlands Educational Expansion Initiative, and earlier, the City of New York Parks & Recreation's Summer Sports experience.
 In 2006, Heckscher Foundation funded the New York Restoration Project which renovated a 5,000 square community space, renamed The Heckscher Foundation Children's Garden, into an outdoor classroom and recreational garden for nearby students.
 The Heckscher Foundation and The William and Mary Greve Foundation incubated, launched and provided the initial funding for the Take the Field project in 2005, which subsequently united public and private funds to rebuild 43 outdoor athletic facilities between 2006 and 2008 at New York City's public high schools. The John Dewey High School athletic facilities were renovated as part of this project and are named for the Heckscher Foundation.
 The Heckscher Foundation underwrote the pilot program Swim for Life NYC, that teaches 2nd graders to swim during the school day. The program includes facilities sharing and complimentary unlimited memberships for participating students and their families to local NYC Parks Department recreation centers.

Arts

 In 2015, the foundation established the Young Artists & Writers Program (YAWP), an education outreach program for students to use writing and theater as a catalyst to discover his/her own personal voice through creative writing and performing. The YAWP program is part of Theatre Lab at Florida Atlantic University.
 In 2014, the foundation funded the WQXR Instrument Drive, which collected unwanted musical instruments from New York area donors for repair and redistribution to local young aspiring musicians.
  In collaboration with the United States Department of Education, the foundation funded Comprehensive Opera-Based Learning and Teaching (COBALT) in a 3-year control group that operated in Red Hook, Coney Island and Bensonhurst schools in Brooklyn.
  The foundation funds Urban Arts Partnership, a non profit that partners with high poverty public schools to implement its Fresh Prep programs, which provides 1,000 students in New York City and San Francisco with free or reduced lunch, in-school classroom sessions, after-school sessions, professional development summer programs arts festivals and a range of art-based instruction such as photography, film making, visual arts, theatre, design and related curriculum.
 Heckscher and J.P. Morgan Chase fund the "Brick by Brick" education program that connects local artists, designers and educators with middle and high school students from four local community centers in Miami, FL.
 In 2014, the foundation funded a project undertaken by The Center for Arts Education to conduct a control group study to test its pilot program for sixth to eighth grade students that seeks to increase reading comprehension and writing skills in students via an arts-integrated education.
 The foundation sponsors its own annual "Free Arts Mural Kids" competitions, coordinated and judged by noted architects Martin Finio and Taryn Christoff of Christoff:Finio Architecture (the architects that designed the foundation's headquarters)that promotes the work of young artists and provides stipends to three finalists. The winning designs are displayed in the lobby of the foundation's headquarters.

References

External links 
 The Heckscher Foundation for Children

Foundations based in the United States
Child-related organizations in the United States
Organizations based in New York City
Organizations established in 1921
1921 establishments in New York City